Cos-1, COS-1, cos-1, or cos−1 may refer to:

 Cos-1, one of two commonly used COS cell lines
 cos x−1 = cos(x)−1 = −(1−cos(x)) = −ver(x) or negative versine of x, the additive inverse (or negation) of an old trigonometric function
 cos−1y = cos−1(y), sometimes interpreted as arccos(y) or arccosine of y, the compositional inverse of the trigonometric function cosine (see below for ambiguity)
 cos−1x = cos−1(x), sometimes interpreted as (cos(x))−1 =  = sec(x) or secant of x, the multiplicative inverse (or reciprocal) of the trigonometric function cosine (see above for ambiguity)
 cos x−1, sometimes interpreted as cos(x−1) = cos(), the cosine of the multiplicative inverse (or reciprocal) of x (see below for ambiguity)
 cos x−1, sometimes interpreted as (cos(x))−1 =  = sec(x) or secant of x, the multiplicative inverse (or reciprocal) of the trigonometric function cosine (see above for ambiguity)

See also
Inverse function
sec−1 (disambiguation)
sin−1 (disambiguation)